Himalopsyche is a genus of free-living caddisflies in the family Rhyacophilidae. There are more than 40 described species in Himalopsyche.

Species
These 46 species belong to the genus Himalopsyche:

 Himalopsyche acharai Malicky & Chantaramongkol, 1989
 Himalopsyche alticola Banks, 1940
 Himalopsyche amitabha Schmid, 1966
 Himalopsyche angnorbui Schmid, 1963
 Himalopsyche anomala Banks, 1940
 Himalopsyche auricularis (Martynov, 1914)
 Himalopsyche baibarana Matsumura, 1931
 Himalopsyche bhagirathi Schmid, 1963
 Himalopsyche biansata Kimmins, 1952
 Himalopsyche diehli Malicky, 1971
 Himalopsyche digitata (Martynov, 1935)
 Himalopsyche dolmasampa Schmid, 1963
 Himalopsyche elegantissima (Forsslund, 1935)
 Himalopsyche eos Malicky, 2000
 Himalopsyche excisa (Ulmer, 1905)
 Himalopsyche fasciolata Kimmins, 1952
 Himalopsyche gigantea (Martynov, 1914)
 Himalopsyche gregoryi (Ulmer, 1932)
 Himalopsyche gyamo Schmid, 1963
 Himalopsyche hageni Banks, 1940
 Himalopsyche hierophylax Schmid, 1966
 Himalopsyche horai (Martynov, 1936)
 Himalopsyche japonica (Morton, 1900)
 Himalopsyche kangsampa Schmid, 1966
 Himalopsyche kuldschensis (Ulmer, 1927)
 Himalopsyche lachlani Banks, 1940
 Himalopsyche lanceolata (Morton, 1900)
 Himalopsyche lepcha Schmid, 1963
 Himalopsyche lua Malicky, 1993
 Himalopsyche lungma Schmid, 1963
 Himalopsyche maculipennis (Ulmer, 1905)
 Himalopsyche maitreya Schmid, 1963
 Himalopsyche malenanda Schmid, 1963
 Himalopsyche martynovi Banks, 1940
 Himalopsyche maxima (Forsslund, 1935)
 Himalopsyche navasi Banks, 1940
 Himalopsyche paranomala Tian & Sun in Tian, Li, Yang & Sun, in Chen, editor, 1993
 Himalopsyche phedongensis Kimmins, 1952
 Himalopsyche phryganea (Ross, 1941)
 Himalopsyche placida Banks, 1947
 Himalopsyche sylvicola Mey, 1996
 Himalopsyche tibetana (Martynov, 1930)
 Himalopsyche todma Schmid, 1963
 Himalopsyche trifurcula Sun & Yang, 1994
 Himalopsyche yatrawalla Schmid, 1966
 Himalopsyche yongma Schmid, 1963

References

Further reading

 
 
 

Trichoptera genera
Articles created by Qbugbot
Spicipalpia